Andrias Høgnason Eriksen (born 22 February 1994) is a Faroese footballer who plays as a defender for B36 Tórshavn and the Faroe Islands national team.

Career
Eriksen made his international debut for Faroe Islands on 8 September 2019 in a UEFA Euro 2020 qualifying match against Spain, which finished as a 0–4 away loss.

Career statistics

International

References

External links
 
 
 
 Andrias Eriksen at FaroeSoccer.com

1994 births
Living people
People from Tórshavn Municipality
Faroese footballers
Faroe Islands youth international footballers
Faroe Islands under-21 international footballers
Faroe Islands international footballers
Faroese expatriate footballers
Expatriate men's footballers in Denmark
Association football defenders
B36 Tórshavn players
Faroe Islands Premier League players
1. deild players